George Howell (5 October 1833 – 17 September 1910) was an English trade unionist and reform campaigner and a Lib-Lab politician, who sat in the House of Commons from 1885 to 1895.

Biography
George Howell was born in Wrington, Somerset, the eldest of eight children of a builder and contractor. He was educated at a Church of England primary school in Bristol until the age of twelve, when he began work with his father, who owned a small builders. By the week he worked twelve hours a day as a mortar-boy, and later a bricklayer, but dedicated Sundays to reading. Among his favourite books were John Foxe's Book of Martyrs and John Bunyan's The Pilgrim's Progress.

Howell grew to dislike his work as a builder so became an apprentice shoemaker. Some of the men he worked with were active chartists and introduced him to radical newspapers including the Northern Star and the Red Republican. As a result, he joined the chartist movement in 1848. Others of his colleagues were Methodists, and Howell attended some of their meetings at Wrington Chapel, before becoming a lay preacher. He also became involved in the local temperance movement.

Howell moved to London in 1854 where he resumed work as a bricklayer, unable to find employment as a shoemaker. He attended many radical political meetings and met prominent radical thinkers of the day, including Karl Marx, George Holyoake, Charles Bradlaugh and Frederic Harrison. He joined the Operative Bricklayers' Society (a New Model Trade Union) in 1859, and played a part in leading the London builders' strike in support of a nine-hour working day. Through his work with the union he became one of the foremost New Model unionists, along with Robert Applegarth and George Potter, but was blacklisted by employers for five years.

He was elected, along with Potter and Applegarth, to the executive of the London Trades Council (LTC) in 1861 and became its secretary. He also became involved in the campaign for universal suffrage, becoming full-time secretary of the Reform League in 1865. Howell organised demonstrations in London in 1866 and 1867, and played an important role in the campaign behind the 1867 Reform Act. However, Howell was not satisfied with the scale of the reform and continued to campaign for universal suffrage.

In 1871 Howell was appointed secretary of the Trades Union Congress (TUC), and regularly contributed to the trade unionist journal The Bee-Hive as well as publishing a number of books throughout the 1870s.

Howell stood for parliament unsuccessfully at Aylesbury in the general elections of 1868 and 1874 and at  Stafford in a by-election in 1881. He finally succeeded in 1885 as Lib–Lab candidate for Bethnal Green North East, London. In Parliament, Howell helped to pass the Merchant Shipping Act 1894 and successfully defended his seat in 1886 and 1892 but was defeated by the Conservative Mancherjee Bhownagree in 1895.

In poor health, Howell retired from public life. His old friend Robert Applegarth and the TUC raised a £1650 testimonial to buy him an annuity before his death. On 17 September 1910, he died at 35 Findon Road, Shepherd's Bush, and was buried at Nunhead Cemetery.

Notable works
 A Handy Book of Labour Laws 1876
 'The History of the International Working Men's Association' 1878
 Conflicts of Capital and Labour 1878
 Trade Unionism New and Old 1891
 Labour Legislation, Labour Movements and Labour Leaders 1902

References

Further reading

F. M. Leventhal, Respectable Radical: George Howell and Victorian Working Class Politics (Cambridge, Massachusetts: Harvard University Press, 1971).

External links 

Spartacus
George Howell's archive and library at Bishopsgate Library

General Secretaries of the Trades Union Congress
Liberal Party (UK) MPs for English constituencies
UK MPs 1885–1886
UK MPs 1886–1892
UK MPs 1892–1895
Liberal-Labour (UK) MPs
British bricklayers
English trade unionists
Chartists
1833 births
1910 deaths
People from Wrington
Members of the Parliamentary Committee of the Trades Union Congress
19th-century British businesspeople